Shabkhoon was an Urdu literary magazine started in June 1966 in Allahabad, India. The magazine was founded and edited by poet and author Shamsur Rahman Faruqi who used to work on it along with his job at the Indian Postal Service. The journal covered the modernist (jadidiyat) voice in Urdu literature at a time when the literary scene was dominated by progressive literature (taraqqi pasand) and was hailed as "the harbinger of modernism in Urdu". The Magazine was calligraphed by a scribe (katib) Salimullah Naiyer. Forty years after being started, the journal was published for the last time in June 2006. Though it was popular, it ceased publication owing to editor Shamsur Rahman Faruqi's failing health.

Describing the support of his wife Jamila Faruqi, Rehman said:

Origins 
Faruqi initially thought of naming the Magazine Teesha (axe or adze) associated with Farhad, a stonemason in the Persian Romance Khosrow and Shirin, who had to cut through a mountain. Finally, Shabkhoon (surprise attack by night) — an allusion to "shaking the world of [urdu] literature out of stasis" — was decided upon. The magazine was financially supported by Faruqi's wife Jamila. It was published for the first time in June 1966 with Progressive writer Ejaz Hussain as its first editor.

Notable Contributors 
The magazine became so popular that progressive writers started contributing to the magazine. The magazine also published works of Pakistani writers. Some of the notable contributors include:

 Adil Mansuri
 Ali Sardar Jafri
 Anwar Sajjad
 Asif Farrukhi
 Balraj Komal
 Intizar Hussain
 Ismat Chughtai
 Rajinder Singh Bedi
 Zafar Iqbal

External links
 Various editions of the magazine are available on Rekhta

References

2006 disestablishments in India
Defunct literary magazines
Defunct magazines published in India
Literary magazines published in India
Magazines established in 1966
Magazines disestablished in 2006
Mass media in Allahabad
Urdu-language magazines
1966 establishments in Uttar Pradesh